Stephen or Steven Skinner may refer to:

Stephen Skinner (lexicographer) (1623–1667), English physician, lexicographer and etymologist
Stephen Skinner (Canadian politician) (1725–1808), provincial legislator in Nova Scotia
Stephen Skinner (American politician), state legislator in West Virginia
Stephen Skinner (author) (born 1948), Australian author of books on magic, feng shui and sacred geometry
Steve Skinner (Stephen Karl Skinner, born 1981), English footballer
Steven K. Skinner, CEO of KemperSports